Dance Hall Racket is a 1953 American film directed by Phil Tucker starring Lenny Bruce (who also wrote the script) and his wife Honey Harlow.

Plot

A gangster who operates a sleazy dance hall uses a sadistic bodyguard to keep his girls afraid and his customers in line. A merchant marine seaman is found murdered and suspicion falls upon the operator of a dime-a-dance honky tonk joint. A federal undercover agent is planted in the place to gather evidence, and he soon learns that the dive is only a cover-up for diamond-smuggling activities, and that one of the operation's henchmen, who is handy with a switch-blade knife, is the killer. Before they can be arrested, the henchman kills his boss and is shot while trying to escape.

Cast

Timothy Farrell as Umberto Scalli
Lenny Bruce as Vincent
Bernie Jones as Punky, the Swedish Sailor
Honey Bruce Friedman Rose (as Honey Harlow)
Sally Marr as Hostess
Bunny Parker as Dancehall Girl
Joie Abrams as Dancehall Girl
Ronald Lee
Bill King
Mary Holiday as Dancehall Girl
Harry Keaton
Joe Piro as Henchman

Soundtrack

Music Department 
Sanford H. Dickinson	...	music consultant (as Sandford H. Dickinson)
Charles Ruddy	...	musical director (uncredited)

References

External links

1953 films
American crime thriller films
American action films
American adventure films
Films directed by Phil Tucker
1950s crime thriller films
1953 adventure films
Lenny Bruce
American black-and-white films
1950s English-language films
1950s American films